Clifton is a suburb of York in the unitary authority of the City of York, in the north of England about  miles from the city centre. The A19, passes north out of York through Clifton.

The old village area was made a Conservation Area in 1968. It is the location of Nestle Foods Factory and the Public Schools of St Peter's and the former Queen Anne's.

The origin of the name is derived from the Old English pre-7th century clif, meaning a gentle slope, or more usually a riverbank, with tun, an enclosure or settlement.

History

During Roman times there was a road through Clifton that approached the Roman fortress from the north-west and headed towards the river crossing. There was a second road that also left the north-west gate and may eventually have joined the other. The evidence from early timber buildings from the museum gardens and early burials from Bootham and Clifton suggest the roads existed from the 1st century. Sporadic 2nd century Roman occupation material and fragments of streets indicate that by that time expansion may have begun in Clifton. This development was not sustained and evidence indicates that from the 3rd century onwards the area beyond St. Mary's was given over to cemeteries.

There are records that show a windmill existed from the late 14th to the early 19th centuries in Burton Stone Lane and was known as Clifton or Lady Windmill. Ownership was recorded between 1374 and 1413 as belonging to John de Roucliff. Other owners recorded were Sir William Ingleby, in the mid 15th century, and Sir William Robinson in the early 18th century. The last record of the mill still being operational was in 1852, but there is no trace of the building now.

Horse racing had begun in York towards the end of the 17th century. In 1708 the corporation recognised the potential for profit from horse racing and that local Clifton landowner, Sir William Robinson, had offered his land on Clifton and Rawcliffe Ings as a racecourse, donated £15 a year towards a plate. Following the winter of 1730 racing moved to the recently drained Knavesmire.

The York Diocesan Church Building Society, founded in 1861, contributed to the building of the church in Clifton between 1867 and 1869.

Governance

Clifton is a ward in the Unitary Authority of the City of York. As of 2015, it is represented by Danny Myers and Margaret Wells, both of whom are members of the local Labour Party.

Demography

The figures below were taken from the Census 2001 Key Statistics for Local Authorities in England and Wales, from the Office for National Statistics on 29 April 2001.

The population in Clifton Ward was 12,017 of which 91.1% were born in England and 4.9% from outside the United Kingdom. The largest Age Group within the population, 22.2%, were between 30 and 44 years old. Of the total population, 94.6% described their ethnic origin as White-British. The figures show that 67.8% declared they were Christian, whilst 30.2% declared no religious belief at all. Of the population aged between 16 and 74 years old, 59.7% declared they were in some form of employment and 10.5% said they were retired. Of the 5,337 households, 21% were Semi-Detached and 57.5% were Terraced. The level of household ownership was 58%.
In 2011, the population of Clifton rose to 13,548 in 5,652 houses.

Geography

Clifton consists of council estates and terraced properties not visible from the main road. Clifton is bounded by the parish of Rawcliffe and Clifton Without to the north, Holgate to the south-west, Heworth to the east and Guildhall Ward to the south-east. The Ward boundary runs from the River Ouse in the west, opposite Acomb Landing, along the back of the Homestead Park and York Sports Club and across the A19 following Water Lane and Lilbourne Drive. It continues north-east along the Bur Dike to behind Burton Green Primary School before heading south-east and then east across Bootham Stray, the B1363 and the Nestle Factory to the River Foss. The river forms the eastern boundary as far as Diamond Street and Walpole Street, where it heads west and then south to the junction of Clarence Street with the Haxby and Wigginton Roads. It heads west past the York District Hospital and then south along the York to Scarborough Railway Line until it reaches the River Ouse at Scarborough Bridge. The remainder of the boundary follows the river north-west to Acomb Landing.

Economy

Most of the population find employment in the city centre or the many retail and industrial parks on the outskirts of York such as Clifton Moor in the nearby area of Clifton Without. Employment can be found within the ward at the Nestle Foods Factory on Haxby Road, and the York District Hospital on Wigginton Road.

Community

The City of York General Hospital started to be built by the city corporation in 1938, but was suspended during the war. The building, comprising half of the intended scheme and costing about £100,000, was opened in 1941 and stood between Huntington Road and Haxby Road. The hospital was next to the Grange and shared facilities, including the nurses' home. The hospital was expanded and renamed York District Hospital in 1977 and from 2010 is now known as The York Hospital.

Clifton was also the home of the North Riding Lunatic Asylum which joined the National Health Service as Clifton Hospital in 1948 but closed in 1994.

Clifton Cinema was built for Mr J Prendergast and Mr Mawson to the designs of Frederick Dyer. It is of Georgian style and the designers were also responsible for the Rialto Cinema, now a Bingo Hall, on the other side of the city in Fishergate. The Clifton opened on 17 November 1937 with the film “Edge of the World” starring John Laurie, Finlay Currie and Campbell Robson, directed by Michael Powell. It seated 1,150 in the stalls and balcony. Despite the relatively small size of the cinema, it was equipped with a two manual Compton organ, first played in 1938 but removed in the early 1960s. The Clifton survived longer than many of York's cinemas, but finally closed on 17 October 1964 with the final film being Valley of the Eagle. As of 2010, it is the home of Clifton Bingo and Social Club, but very little change has been made to the building.

Bootham Crescent, home of York City F.C., is located in Clifton.

Homestead Park on Water End has a Youth Hostel in its grounds and was given to the people of the city by Seebohm Rowntree, son of Joseph. It is maintained by the Joseph Rowntree Foundation.

There are council run allotments at Crichton Avenue and Wigginton Terrace, just off Wigginton Road.

Transport

Due to the A19 and Clifton Retail Park being within the Ward boundary, Clifton is served by many bus routes. As of 2013 they are:

 Rawcliffe Bar Park & Ride to the City Centre run by First Transport Group
 Clifton Moor to Osbaldwick run by First Transport Group
 York to Easingwold via Linton-On-Ouse run by Stephensons of Easingwold Ltd
 York to Easingwold via Alne and Tollerton run by Stephensons of Easingwold Ltd
 York to Kirbymoorside via Easingwold and Helmsley run by Stephensons of Easingwold Ltd
 York to Helmsley run by Stephensons of Easingwold Ltd
 City Centre to Skelton via Burton Stone Lane, Leeman Road (Towards City), Bur Dyke Avenue, Brompton Road & Rawcliffe run by Reliance
 Askham Bar to University of York via Acomb, Poppleton, Rawcliffe, Clifton Moor, Wigginton, Haxby, New Earswick, Huntington, Monks Cross & Osbaldwick run by Transdev York
 York to Thirsk run by Reliance Motor Services

Education

Burdyke County Primary School in Kingsway North, on the Water Lane estate, was opened in September 1954. It is currently known as Burton Green Primary School. A second primary school is Clifton Green Primary School formally known as Kingsway Junior School. Clifton falls in the secondary school catchment area of the Vale of York Academy in nearby Clifton Without.

Clifton National School for Girls and Infants, also known as Burton Stone Lane School, was opened in 1841. In 1878 the girls were transferred to the new Clifton girls' school and Burton Lane continued as an infants' school until 1892 when they rejoined the girls' school. The Burton Lane School was closed in 1892 and the building demolished. In 1914, additional accommodation for the infants was obtained in the parochial hall in Water Lane and the school itself was used for girls only. By 1932 the school had been reorganised to provide infant accommodation only. The school became a controlled voluntary primary school in 1950 and is known as Burton Green School.

Burton Stone Lane County Secondary Modern School was a girls' school, and sometimes known as Water Lane School, was opened in October 1942. The senior girls' department from Shipton Street School was transferred here and formed the nucleus of the school. The building was completed in 1945. As of 2010, it is the council run Burton Stone Community Centre.

Queen Anne Grammar School for Girls began as the Municipal Secondary School for Girls in 1906, located in Brook Street, and was officially recognised as a secondary school in 1908. The Brook Street premises were closed in 1909 and pupils transferred to a new school building, on a -acre site on Queen Anne's Road, Clifton. New classrooms and additional cloakrooms were erected in 1914. The school closed in 2000 and the campus was taken over by St Olave's School, the junior school of St Peter's.

St. Peter's School, an independent, co-educational secondary school was founded in the 7th century, and is the third oldest school in the world. St Peter's was originally the school attached to York Minster. The school is where Guy Fawkes was educated.

Religious sites

The first Methodist society in Clifton met in a cottage in the 1870s and in April 1884 the Avenue Terrace Chapel was opened.  A larger chapel on the site of 'Clifton Cottage' was opened in 1909.

The Grade II listed church of St. Philip and St. James, was built between 1866 and 1867 next to Clifton Green, G.F. Jones of York being the architect.

St Joseph's Catholic Church is located on the roundabout at the northern end of Kingsway North on Burdyke Avenue.

References

Villages and areas in the City of York